Glaucus is the name of no fewer than four rivers of Asia Minor noted by authors in classical antiquity.

 A tributary of the Phasis in Colchis, now called Tchorocsou. (Strab. xi. p. 498; Plin. vi. 4.)  The Phasis is now called the Rioni, and Colchis is in the modern republic of Georgia.
 One of the two small rivers by the union of which the Apsorrhus or Acampsis (mod. Çoruh), in Pontus (Turkey), is formed. (Ptol. v. 6. § 7.) 
 A tributary of the Maeander in Phrygia, not far from Eumeneia. (Plin. v. 29.) There are coins with the name of this river. (Leake, Asia Minor, p. 157.) 
 A river in Lycia, on the frontier of Caria, which empties itself into the bay of Telmissus, whence that bay is sometimes called Sinus Glaucus. (Plin. vi. 29; Quint. Smyrn. Posthom. iv. 6, foil.; Strab. xiv. p. 651.) The modern name of the bay is Makri. Steph. B. mentions a δῆμος Γλαύκου, which was probably a place on the banks of the river.

References

Anatolia
Rivers of Turkey